The W.S. Kohl Barn near Richfield, Idaho, United States, is a lava rock barn built in c. 1917, probably by skilled stonemason Jack Oughton and by Sandy Reed.  Its design appears to be that of a plan advertised by the Gem State Lumber Company of Richfield, and its approximate date of construction is determined by record of farmer W.S. Kohl taking out a mortgage for it in 1917.

It is located about a mile northwest of Richfield.

It was listed on the National Register of Historic Places in 1983.

It was listed in a group with many other lava rock structures in Jerome and Lincoln counties.

References

Barns on the National Register of Historic Places in Idaho
Buildings and structures completed in 1917
Buildings and structures in Lincoln County, Idaho
National Register of Historic Places in Lincoln County, Idaho